Neverkino is a rural locality (a selo) and the administrative center of Neverkinsky District, Penza Oblast, Russia. The development of the locality’s population, by year: 

References

Notes

Sources

Rural localities in Penza Oblast
Kuznetsky Uyezd (Saratov Governorate)